The Ukase of 1799 (Russian: Указ 1799 года) was a decree of Tsar Paul I issued on 8 July 1799 which claimed a southern border of Russian America along the 55th parallel north. The United American Company was given a controlling interest in the chartered Russian-American Company and a monopoly of commercial activities in Russian America and on the Kuril Islands was granted for a period of twenty years. Russian fur traders were forbidden to operate in Russian America unless affiliated with the RAC, although foreign traders were still allowed access.  The Company was also authorised to establish colonies where its directors deemed prudent. The patent was later superseded by Tsar Alexander Is Ukase of 1821.

See also

Russian colonization of the Americas
Russian Alaska

References

History of the Pacific Northwest
Russian-American Company
1799